The Franklin Historic District in Franklin, Louisiana was established by the listing of a  area as a historic district on the National Register of Historic Places in 1982.  The listing then included 327 contributing buildings and one other contributing structure.  The district was expanded in 2005 to add seven more contributing buildings at 600-608 Palfrey Street.  The modified district included 334 contributing buildings and 89 non-contributing intrusions.

The district includes eight blocks of Main Street through Franklin, which runs north–south.  It includes five blocks of east-west Adams Street.  It is an irregular shape bounded roughly by Main St. and Teche Dr. on the east, Adams St. and Iberia St. on the north, Anderson and Second St. on the west, St. John, Willow, and Clark Sts. on the south.

The district includes Greek Revival, Stick/Eastlake, and Queen Anne architecture.

Notes

References

Historic districts on the National Register of Historic Places in Louisiana
Stick-Eastlake architecture in the United States
Greek Revival architecture in Louisiana
Queen Anne architecture in Louisiana
St. Mary Parish, Louisiana